The cast of the television series MythBusters perform experiments to verify or debunk urban legends, old wives' tales, and the like. This is a list of the various myths tested on the show as well as the results of the experiments (the myth is Busted, Plausible, or Confirmed).

The show's first season used "True" instead of "Confirmed"; for the sake of consistency, "Confirmed" will be used on this page.

Episode overview

Episode 1 – "Exploding Toilet"
 Original air date: September 23, 2003

Exploding Toilet
This experiment formally introduced Buster the crash test dummy.

Who Gets Wetter?

Magic Bullet
This myth tested the feasibility of magic bullets that can be used to assassinate without leaving evidence, used as a plot device or otherwise mentioned in many movies, such as Most Wanted or Three Days of the Condor. A request for information to the Central Intelligence Agency was declined. Due to the myth's inclusion in many Kennedy assassination conspiracy theories, they chose to use a Carcano rifle similar to the assassination weapon for testing.

Episode 2 – "Cell Phone Destroys Gas Station"
 Original air date: October 3, 2003

Cell Phone Destruction
Inspired by e-mails leading to some gas stations discouraging cell phone use during refueling, and also because at the time of the episode, there were 150 gas station fires annually in America.

This is also known as the myth that birthed two memorable MythBusters one-liners—Jamie's "Jamie wants big boom" and Adam's "Am I missing an eyebrow?"

Silicone Breasts

Exploding CDs?

Episode 3 – "Barrel of Bricks"
 Original air date: October 10, 2003

Barrel of Bricks

Peeing on the Third Rail

While testing the myth at a train yard, the yard's operators gave Adam permission to test a "mini-myth" with one of their engines:

Eelskin Wallet

Episode 4 – "Penny Drop"
 Original air date: October 17, 2003

Penny Drop

Radio Tooth Fillings

Microwave Madness
Despite mid-episode teasers, the MythBusters refused to microwave a live poodle, and were thus unable to test the myth that a microwave can dry a wet dog.

Episode 5 – "Buried Alive"
 Original air date: October 24, 2003

Buried Alive

101 Uses For Cola
Cola is able to...

Hammer Bridge Drop

Episode 6 – "Lightning Strikes/Tongue Piercings"
 Original air date: November 11, 2003

Lightning Strikes Tongue Piercing
Inspired by 17-year-old Matthew Thomsen being hit by lightning near Denver in August 2003, which knocked his tongue piercing out of his mouth.

Tree Cannon

Beat the Breath Test
A BACtrack B70 breathalyzer owned and operated by the San Francisco Police Department Crime Lab was used to test Adam's and Jamie's blood alcohol levels to ensure they were intoxicated. They then experimented to see if it is possible to pass a field sobriety test despite being over the limit, by...

Episode 7 – "Stinky Car"
 Original air date: December 5, 2003

Stinky Car
Inspired by a story of an attractive sports car being available at a very low price, but with a catch: someone had died in the car, and even despite cleaning attempts, the smell had persisted, meaning that the owner was finding it very tough to sell the car. To test this, Jamie and Adam procured a 1987 Chevrolet Corvette and placed two fresh pig corpses in it, which was sealed with tape and placed in a shipping container for two months.

If a decomposing body is left in a car long enough...

Raccoon Rocket

Episode 8 – "Alcatraz Escape"
 Original air date: December 12, 2003

Escape From Alcatraz

Does a Duck's Quack Echo?
This myth originated in lists of "Random Facts" distributed over the Internet.

Stud Finders & Mind Control Chips

References

External links

 MythBusters Official site
 

2003 American television seasons
2003